Neil Young Journeys is a 2011 American concert documentary film produced and directed by Jonathan Demme, featuring Neil Young and produced for Sony Pictures Classics. It is, along with Neil Young: Heart of Gold (2006) and Neil Young Trunk Show (2009), part of a Neil Young trilogy directed by Demme.

Content
The film has Young visiting his childhood home of Omemee, Ontario, with his brother where he arrives at his old haunts and tells stories of the people from his past. In addition, he passes by Scott Young Public School, which was named in honor of his father, Scott Young.

Another major portion of the film is Young performing a concert at Massey Hall in Toronto, which features primarily his newer compositions. However, there are five classic songs with "Ohio" being the most prominent with archival footage of the Kent State Shootings in 1970 with photographs of the four students who were killed in the incident being displayed.

Songs in the film
All songs are written by Young, except where otherwise noted.
 
 "Peaceful Valley Boulevard"
 "Ohio" 
 "Down by the River"
 "Sign Of Love"
 "Rumbling"
 "Love And War"
 "Leia"
 "After the Gold Rush"
 "I Believe In You"
 "My My, Hey Hey (Out of the Blue)" - written by Neil Young and Jeff Blackburn
 "You Never Call"
 "Hitchhiker"
 "Walk With Me"
 "Helpless" - played over the credits

Reception
Neil Young Journeys has a 93% "fresh" rating on Rotten Tomatoes on 42 reviews with an average rating of 7.1/10. The film holds a 74/100 rating, indicating "generally favorable reviews".

See also
 Scott Young
 Crosby, Stills, Nash & Young

References

External links
 
 
 
 
 

Neil Young
2011 films
2011 documentary films
American documentary films
Films directed by Jonathan Demme
Concert films
Documentary films about singers
Films set in Ontario
Films shot in Toronto
American independent films
American road movies
2010s road movies
Rockumentaries
Sony Pictures Classics films
2010s English-language films
2010s American films